Yamishibai: Japanese Ghost Stories also known in Japan as  and Theater of Darkness is an ongoing Japanese anime series. The first season was directed by Tomoya Takashima, with scripts written by Hiromu Kumamoto and produced by ILCA. Each episode was animated to mimic the kamishibai method of story-telling. The series is organized into a collection of shorts with each episode being only a few minutes in length. Each episode features a different tale based on myths and urban legends of Japanese origin.

The first season premiered on TV Tokyo on July 14, 2013, and ran for thirteen episodes until September 29, 2013; it spawned a host of merchandise and a mobile game while also receiving mixed reactions at the end of its broadcast. A second season aired from July 6, 2014, to September 28, 2014, and was directed by both Takashi Shimizu and Noboru Iguchi along with scripts written by Shōichirō Masumoto. The third season aired between January 11, 2016, and April 3, 2016. A fourth season aired between January 16, 2017 and March 26, 2017. A fifth season aired on July 2, 2017 and ended on October 1, 2017. A sixth season aired on July 6, 2018. A seventh season aired on July 7, 2019. An eighth season aired on January 10, 2021. A ninth season aired on July 11, 2021 with the theme of the episodes being based on the Chinese Zodiac. A tenth season started airing in January 2022.

A spin-off titled Ninja Collection aired on July 12, 2020. A live-action adaptation later aired.

Synopsis
Every week at 5 p.m. an old man in a yellow mask (the kamishibaiya or kamishibai narrator) shows up at a children's playground and tells them ghost stories based on myths and urban legends of Japanese origin. The man tells the stories on the back of his bicycle using a traditional  method and features a new tale each week. In the third season, instead of the old man in a yellow mask and his kamishibai stage, a boy (later revealed to be the kamishibaiya in the form of a child) sits on a playground slide and sings, "Friends on that side, come to this side... Friends on this side, go to that side..." as he draws illustrations of the creatures in the stories. At the end of each episode, the narrator's mask sings the closing song to him, multiplying in number as each episode ends with the final one being worn on the boy's face. As of Season 4, the kamishibaiya returns, telling the stories to children at a playground every 5 p.m., going back to the original format of Seasons 1 and 2 (voice actors are different every episode). In Season 5, the children are not seen playing on the swings. Instead, they gather to the call of the old man in silhouette. In Season 6, the old man tells his stories in a forest instead of a school. A shadow takes the form of the old man then puts on the mask as he introduces the story. In Season 7, the old man tells his stories in a creepy apartment. In Season 8, he tells his stories at a busy urban intersection, surrounded by vague shadowy passersby. In Season 9, he tells the stories to the animals from the Chinese Zodiac. The tenth season has the narrator slowly making his announcement in an empty playground only to stop halfway; the season finale is based on Hyakumonogatari Kaidankai.

Production

The first season of the series is produced by ILCA and directed by Tomoya Takashima along with script writing by Hiromu Kumamoto and narrated by Kanji Tsuda. The series is animated in such a way as to mimic a traditional Japanese method of storytelling known as Kamishibai.

The second season was directed by Takashi Shimizu and Noboru Iguchi while Shōichirō Masumoto wrote the script.

Release
The 13-episode first season premiered on July 14, 2013 on TV Tokyo during the station's 26:15 (02:15 JST) time slot, which technically resulted in the episodes airing on the days following the ones scheduled. The series was later aired on AT-X. Crunchyroll also acquired both seasons of the series for online simulcast streaming in select parts of the world with English subtitles. On April 4, 2014 All-Entertainment Co., Ltd. released season one in its entirety on a single DVD volume in Japan. The first and second seasons have been licensed by Sentai Filmworks. A second season aired from July 6, 2014 to September 28, 2014. A third season aired from January 11, 2016 to April 3, 2016. A fourth season premiered in January 2017. A fifth season premiered in July 2017. A sixth season aired on July 6, 2018. Sentai Filmworks will be re-releasing the series with an English dub which was slated to be released in 2019, but has currently delayed. A seventh season aired on July 7, 2019. A spin-off titled Ninja Collection aired on July 12, 2020. An eighth season aired on January 10, 2021. A ninth season aired on July 11, 2021 with the theme of the episodes being based on the Chinese Zodiac. A tenth season will air in January 2022.

Episodes

Season 1

Season 2

Season 3

Season 4

Season 5

Season 6

Season 7

Season 8

Season 9

Season 10

Notes and references
Notes

References

External links
  

Animation anthology series
Horror anime and manga
Horror anthologies
Muse Communication
Sentai Filmworks
Theatre in anime and manga
TV Tokyo original programming